Amstel Malta Box Office, also known as AMBO is a Nigerian television reality show launched in 2005.
The TV reality show is sponsored by Nigerian Breweries, the largest brewing company in Nigeria. 
The show centered on the cinema of Nigeria, often referred to as Nollywood and had produced several award-winning Nollywood stars such as Alex Okoroji, Bayray McNwizu, Annabella Zwyndila and OC Ukeje.
The first maiden edition was directed by Niji Akanni and it is won by Azizat Sadiq.

References

Nigerian reality television series
2000s Nigerian television series